Alan Selby (1929–2004), born Alan Henry Sniders in England, was a gay businessman and leader in the San Francisco leather community. He was known by many as "the Mayor of Folsom Street".

He claimed to have created the first hanky code with his business partners at Leather 'n' Things in 1972, when their bandana supplier inadvertently doubled their order and the expanded code would help them sell the extra colors they had received. However, other sources dispute this being the origin of the hanky code.

He moved to San Francisco in 1979 to found the fetish clothing manufacturer Mr. S Leather. At one point this business was operated by Judy Tallwing McCarthey.

Selby co-founded and fundraised for the San Francisco AIDS Emergency Fund, which was founded  in 1982. Following the death of his partner, Peter Jacklin, from AIDS in 1987, Selby became a prominent figure in the community response against the AIDS epidemic.

Selby died in 2004 from emphysema at the age of 75.

Awards and legacy 
 In 1988, Selby was awarded the Steve Maidhof Award for National or International Work by the National Leather Association International.
 In 1989, he received the Man of the Year Award as part of the Pantheon of Leather Awards.
 In 1999, he and Leonard Dworkin received the Forebear Award as part of the Pantheon of Leather Awards.
 In 2004, Selby received the Lifetime Achievement Award as part of the Pantheon of Leather Awards.
 In 2013, Selby was posthumously inducted into the Leather Hall of Fame.
 In 2017, Selby was honored along with other notables, named on bronze bootprints, as part of San Francisco South of Market Leather History Alley.

In 2019, an exhibition at the GLBT Historical Society Museum celebrated Selby's life and legacy.

References 

1929 births
2004 deaths
Leather subculture
American LGBT businesspeople
HIV/AIDS activists
20th-century LGBT people
21st-century LGBT people